Jaaginema is a genus of cyanobacteria belonging to the family Pseudanabaenaceae.

The genus has cosmopolitan distribution.

Species:

Jaaginema angustissimum 
Jaaginema geminatum 
Jaaginema minimum 
Jaaginema neglectum 
Jaaginema perfilievii 
Jaaginema pseudogeminatum 
Jaaginema quadripunctulatum 
Jaaginema subtilissimum 
Jaaginema woronichinii

References

Synechococcales
Cyanobacteria genera